A burnous, also burnoose, bournous or barnous, is a long cloak of coarse woollen fabric with a pointed hood, often white in colour, traditionally worn by Berber men in North Africa. In antiquity this garment was referred to as byruss Numidicus meaning “Numidian hooded cloak” and was mentioned as such in the Expositio totius mundi et gentium. In the Maghreb, the colour of the burnous may be white, beige, or dark brown. There are rock engravings near Sigus that attest the existence of the burnous in the ancient times, it was also worn by the Numidians.

Historically, the white burnous was worn during important events by men of high positions. Today, men of different social standing may wear it for ceremonial occasions, such as weddings or on religious and national holidays.

Cultural significance

In Algeria 
During the French colonial period in Algeria (1830-1962), the burnous became a symbol of resistance and identity for Algerians. Many Algerians, including those who were not nomadic, began wearing the burnous as a way to assert their cultural heritage and resist French influence. The burnous was also worn during the Algerian War of Independence (1954-1962), both as a symbol of resistance and as a practical garment for guerrilla fighters operating in the mountains and deserts.

Today, the burnous remains an important symbol of Algerian culture and identity. It is often worn on special occasions, such as weddings and religious festivals, and is sometimes used as a costume in traditional dance performances.

Burnous in other cultures 
The burnous became a distinctive part of the uniform of the French Army of Africa's spahi cavalry, recruited in Algeria, Morocco, and Tunisia. It was also sometimes worn unofficially by officers or soldiers of other units in North Africa. The white burnous remains part of the parade uniform of the one remaining spahi regiment of the French Army: the 1st Spahi Regiment.

Other names for a burnous include albornoz, sbernia, sberna, and bernusso.

See also
Birrus
Bernos
Kaftan
Qashabiya
Jelaba
Qamis

References

External links

Moroccan clothing
Algerian clothing
Tunisian clothing
Robes and cloaks